The 1998 Commonwealth of Independent States Cup was the sixth edition of the competition between the champions of former republics of Soviet Union. It was won by Dynamo Kyiv for the third time in a row.

Participants

 1 Tulevik Viljandi participated as a farm club of Flora Tallinn (1997–98 season 1st team as of the winter break), after both Flora and Lantana Tallinn (1996–97 Estonian champions) withdrew.
 2 Kapaz Ganja replaced Neftchi Baku (1996–97 Azerbaijan champions).

Group stage

Group A

Results

Group B
Unofficial table

Official table

Results

Group С

Results

Group D

Results

Final rounds

Quarterfinals

Semifinals

Final

Top scorers

External links
 1998 Commonwealth of Independent States Cup at RSSSF

1998
1998 in Russian football
1997–98 in Ukrainian football
1997–98 in European football
January 1998 sports events in Russia
February 1998 sports events in Russia
1998 in Moscow